Lipeng Zhang (Chinese name 张立鹏; born March 10, 1990), is a Chinese mixed martial artist who competes in the Lightweight division of ONE Championship. Zhang has also competed in the lightweight division of the Ultimate Fighting Championship. He won his UFC contract through an 8-man tournament on The Ultimate Fighter: China.

Mixed martial arts career

Early professional career
Zhang made his professional mixed martial arts debut in 2009, competing primarily for regional promotions in China, compiling a record of 7-7-1 before earning a tryout on the Ultimate Fighter in 2013.

The Ultimate Fighter: China
In the fall of 2013, it was announced that Zhang had been selected as one of the welterweight participants for Team Sky Dragons on the inaugural season of The Ultimate Fighter: China.

Zhang won his first fight on the show, defeating Zhu Qingxiang by submission in the first round (strikes).  Zhang then went on to defeat Albert Cheng by submission (kimura) in the second round to advance to the finals.

Ultimate Fighting Championship
Zhang made his official debut facing fellow castmate Wang Sai in the welterweight finals on March 1, 2014 The Ultimate Fighter: China Finale.  Zhang defeated Sai by split decision.

Zhang faced Brendan O'Reilly in a lightweight bout on August 23, 2014 at UFC Fight Night 48.  Zhang defeated O'Reilly via unanimous decision.

Zhang faced Chris Wade on January 18, 2015 at UFC Fight Night 59. He lost via unanimous decision.

Zhang faced Kajan Johnson on May 16, 2015 at UFC Fight Night 66. He lost the fight via unanimous decision and was subsequently released from the promotion.

ONE Championship
Since returning to China he enjoyed considerable success with Kunlun Fight, becoming the promotion’s welterweight champion and winning 21 out of his last 24 fights (with 10 submissions and 7 knockouts). This resulted in ONE Championship signing him to a contract.

Zhang faced Eduard Folayang at ONE Championship: Battleground 2 on August 13, 2021. He won the bout via unanimous decision.

Zhang faced Ruslan Emilbek Uulu at ONE: Only the Brave on January 28, 2022. He knocked out his opponent within 32 seconds off the first round.

Zhang faced Saygid Izagakhmaev at ONE 161 on September 29, 2022. He lost the fight via unanimous decision.

Championships and accomplishments 
ONE Championship
Performance of the Night (One time) 

Kunlun Fight 
Kunlun MMA Welterweight Champion (one time) 
Kunlun MMA Lightweight Champion (one time, one defense) 

Ultimate Fighting Championship 
The Ultimate Fighter: China Welterweight Tournament Winner

Mixed martial arts record

|-
|Loss
|align=center|33–12–2
|Saygid Izagakhmaev 
|Decision (unanimous)
|ONE 161
|
|align=center|3
|align=center|5:00
|Kallang, Singapore 
|
|-
|Win
|align=center|
|Ruslan Emilbek Uulu 
|KO (punches) 
|ONE: Only the Brave
||
|align=center|1
|align=center|0:32
|Kallang, Singapore
| 
|-
|Win
|align=center|32–11–2
|Eduard Folayang
|Decision (unanimous)
| ONE: Battleground 2
||
|align=center|3
|align=center|5:00
|Kallang, Singapore
|
|-
|Win
|align=center|31–11–2
|Mohammad Naeemi
|Submission (triangle choke)
|Kunlun Fight 83
|
|align=center|1
|align=center|4:00
|Zunyi, China
|
|-
|Draw
|align=center|30–11–2
|Ednilson Barros Santos
|Draw (unanimous)
|KLF - Kunlun Fight 81
|
|align=center|3
|align=center|5:00
|Beijing, China
|
|-
|Win
|align=center|30–11–1
|Kevin Dellow 
|TKO (elbows & punches)
|Kunlun Fight: Elite Fight Night 2
|
|align=center|1
|align=center|2:52
|Tongling, China
|
|-
|Win
|align=center|29–11–1
|James Chaney
|Submission (rear-naked choke)
|Kunlun Fight 76
|
|align=center|1
|align=center|2:18
|Zhangqiu, China
|
|-
|Loss
|align=center|28–11–1
|Elnur Agaev
|Decision (Split)
|MFP 220/ KLF: Kunlun Fight vs. Modern Fighting Pankration
|
|align=center|3
|align=center|5:00
|Khabarovsk, Russia
|
|-
|Win
|align=center|28–10–1
|Bagautdin Abasov
|Submission (Rear-Naked Choke)
|KLF - Kunlun Fight 71
|
|align=center|2
|align=center|3:07
|Qingdao, China
|
|-
|Win
|align=center|27–10–1
|Italo da Silva Goncalves
|TKO (Elbows)
|Kunlun Fight 69 - All Star Kunlun Fight Finals Night
|
|align=center|2
|align=center|1:47
|Guiyang, China
|
|-
|Win
|align=center|26–10–1
|Mikey Vaotuua
|Submission (rear-naked choke)
|Kunlun Fight MMA 16/Australian Fighting Championship 22
|
|align=center|1
|align=center|1:35
|Melbourne, Australia
|
|-
|Loss
|align=center|25–10–1
|Rodrigo Caporal
|KO (punches)
|Kunlun Fight MMA 15
|
|align=center|1
|align=center|4:46
|Alxa, China
|
|-
|Win
|align=center|25–9–1
|Ivica Truscek
|TKO (punches)
|Kunlun Fight MMA 14
|
|align=center|1
|align=center| N/A
|Qingdao, China
|
|-
|Win
|align=center|24–9–1
|Stanislav Dobeshev
|TKO
|Kunlun Fight MMA 13
|
|align=center|1
|align=center|N/A
|Qingdao, China
|
|-
|Win
|align=center|23–9–1
|Rodrigo Caporal
|Decision (unanimous)
|Kunlun Fight MMA 11
|
|align=center|3
|align=center|5:00
|Jining, China
|
|-
|Win
|align=center|22–9–1
|Hermes França
|Decision (unanimous)
|Kunlun Fight MMA 9
|
|align=center|3
|align=center|5:00
|Sanya, China
|
|-
|Win
|align=center|21–9–1
|Leandro Rodrigues Pontes
|TKO (punches)
|Kunlun Fight MMA 8
|
|align=center|1
|align=center|2:52
|Sanya, China
|
|-
|Win
|align=center|20–9–1
|Javier Fuentes
|TKO (punches)
|Kunlun Fight 55
|
|align=center|1
|align=center| N/A
|Qingdao, China
|
|-
|Win
|align=center|19–9–1
|Adam Boussif
|Submission (rear-naked choke)
|Kunlun Fight 53
|
|align=center|2
|align=center|3:17
|Beijing, China
|
|-
|Win
|align=center|18–9–1
|Yul Kim
|Decision (unanimous)
|Kunlun Fight 47
|
|align=center|3
|align=center|5:00
|Nanjing, China
|
|-
|Win
|align=center|17–9–1
|Jan Quaeyhaegens
|Submission
|Kunlun Fight 45
|
|align=center|1
|align=center|N/A
|Chengdu, China
|
|-
|Win
|align=center|16–9–1
|Cesar Alonso
|TKO (punches)
|Kunlun Fight 44
|
|align=center|1
|align=center|2:40
|Khabarovsk, Russia
|
|-
|Win
|align=center|15-9-1
|Takashi Noto
|KO (punches)
|Kunlun Fight 43
|
|align=center|1
|align=center|0:00
|Zhoukou, China
|
|-
|Win
|align=center|14–9–1
|Beibit Nazarov
|Decision (unanimous)
|Kunlun Fight 37
|
|align=center|3
|align=center|5:00
|Sanya, China
|
|-
|Win
|align=center|13–9–1
|Young Gi Hong
|Submission (rear-naked choke)
|Road FC 27
|
|align=center|1
|align=center|1:33
|Shanghai, China
|
|-
|Win
|align=center|12–9–1
| Gadzhimusa Gadzhiev
|Submission (north-south choke)
| Kunlun Fight 34
|
|align=center|2
|align=center|1:31
| Shenzhen, China
|
|-
|Win
|align=center|11–9–1
| Amr Fathee Wahman
|Submission (armbar)
| Kunlun Fight 33 - World Tour
|
|align=center|1
|align=center|4:23
| Hunan, China
|
|-
|Win
|align=center|10–9–1
|Makoto Maeda
|Submission (rear-naked choke)
|Kunlun Fight - Cage Series 4
|
|align=center|1
|align=center|1:53
|Kazakhstan
|
|-
|Loss
|align=center|9–9–1
|Kajan Johnson
|Decision (unanimous)
|UFC Fight Night: Edgar vs. Faber
|
|align=center|3
|align=center|5:00
|Pasay, Philippines
|
|-
|Loss
|align=center|9–8–1
| Chris Wade
|Decision (unanimous)
| UFC Fight Night: McGregor vs. Siver
|
|align=center|3
|align=center|5:00
|Boston, Massachusetts, United States
|
|-
|Win
|align=center|9–7–1
| Brendan O'Reilly
|Decision (unanimous)
| UFC Fight Night: Bisping vs. Le
|
|align=center|3
|align=center|5:00
| Macau, SAR, China
|
|-
|Win
|align=center|8–7–1
| Wang Sai
|Decision (split)
| The Ultimate Fighter China Finale: Kim vs. Hathaway
|
|align=center|3
|align=center|5:00
| Macau, SAR, China
|
|-
|Win
|align=center|7–7–1
| Isamu Himura
|TKO (punches)
|  TICFT Tournament
|
|align=center|2
|align=center|N/A
|Shandong, China
|
|-
|Loss
|align=center|6–7–1
| Chris Garcia
|Technical Submission (guillotine choke)
|  Real Fight MMA Championship 2
|
|align=center|1
|align=center|0:34
|Zhengzhou, China
|
|-
|Loss
|align=center|6–6–1
| Marcos Souza
|Decision (unanimous)
| Real Fight MMA Championship 1
|
|align=center|2
|align=center|5:00
|Zhengzhou, China
|
|-
|Win
|align=center|6–5–1
| Jae Seong Oh
|N/A
| Real Fight MMA Championship 1
|
|align=center|N/A
|align=center|N/A
|Zhengzhou, China
|
|-
|Win
|align=center|5–5–1
| Pengfei Xuan
|Submission (punches)
| RUFF 5 
|
|align=center|1
|align=center|1:10
|Hohhot, China
|
|-
|Loss
|align=center|4–5–1
| Arthit Hanchana
|Submission (triangle choke)
| RUFF 4 
|
|align=center|3
|align=center|2:53
|Hohhot, China
|
|-
|Loss
|align=center|4–4–1
| Rodrigo Caporal
|Decision (split)
| RUFF 3 
|
|align=center|3
|align=center|5:00
|Chongqing, China
|
|-
|Draw
|align=center|4–3–1
|Aziz Pahrudinov
|Draw
|TFC 7 
|
|align=center|3
|align=center|5:00
|Beijing, China
|
|-
|Win
|align=center|4–3
|Yier Ta
|Submission (triangle choke)
|RUFF 1 
|
|align=center|1
|align=center|3:00
|Shanghai, China
|
|-
|Loss
|align=center|3–3
|Gadji Zaipulaev
|Submission (guillotine choke)
| FEFoMP - Mayor's Cup 2011
|
|align=center|2
|align=center|4:30
|Khabarovsk Krai, Russia
|
|-
|Loss
|align=center|3–2
|Tony Rossini
|Submission (armbar)
| Legend FC 2
|
|align=center|1
|align=center|2:56
| Hong Kong, SAR, China
|
|-
|Win
|align=center|3–1
|Andrei Miroshnikov
|KO (punches) 
| FEFoMP - Sakhalin Cup
|
|align=center|N/A
|align=center|N/A
|Yuzhno-Sakhalinsk, Russia
|
|-
|Loss
|align=center|2–1
|Claes Beverlov
|Submission (armbar)
| AOW 14 - Ground Zero
|
|align=center|1
|align=center|1:58
| Macau, SAR, China
|
|-
|Win
|align=center|2–0
| Yao Qiang
|Submission (triangle choke)
| AOW 13 - Rising Force
|
|align=center|1
|align=center|1:58
|Beijing, China
|
|-
|Win
|align=center|1–0
|Arthit Hanchana
|Decision (unanimous)
|UMAC - Ultimate Martial Arts Combat
|
|align=center|2
|align=center|5:00
|Beijing, China
|
|-

Mixed martial arts exhibition record

|-
|Win
|align=center|2–0
| Albert Cheng
|Submission (kimura)
|rowspan=2|The Ultimate Fighter: China
|
|align=center|2
|align=center|N/A
|rowspan=2|Beijing, China
|
|-
|Win
|align=center|1–0
|Zhu Qingxiang
|Submission (punches)
| (airdate)
|align=center|1
|align=center|N/A
|
|-

See also
 List of current ONE fighters
 List of male mixed martial artists

References

External links
 
 

1990 births
Living people
Chinese practitioners of Brazilian jiu-jitsu
Chinese male mixed martial artists
Lightweight mixed martial artists
Welterweight mixed martial artists
People from Hohhot
People from Tongliao
Sportspeople from Inner Mongolia
Kunlun Fight MMA Fighters
Ultimate Fighting Championship male fighters
Mixed martial artists utilizing sanshou
Mixed martial artists utilizing Shuai Jiao
Mixed martial artists utilizing Muay Thai 
Mixed martial artists utilizing Brazilian jiu-jitsu
Kunlun Fight MMA champions